Juan II is the name of:

 Juan II of Aragon (1398–1479), called "the Faithless" or "the Great"
 Juan II of Castile (1405–1454)
 Juan Pizarro II (1505 or 1511 – 1536/1537), Spanish conquistador
 Juan II de la Cerda (c. 1514 – 1575), 4th Duke of Medinaceli
 Juan II de Braganza (1603–1656), called "the Restorer", was also John IV of Portugal

See also
John II (disambiguation)
Jean II (disambiguation)